Mark Holyoake is a New Zealand gymnast, born in Wellington. He was placed 25th at the 2005 World Artistic Gymnastics Championships and 11th at the 2006 Commonwealth Games. He was part of the New Zealand team that placed 4th at the 2010 Commonwealth Games and he also placed 4th on the Parallel bars at the same event. In 2010, Mark Holyoake retired and is now a personal trainer at Les Mills International.

Pommel horse world record
In 2009 Mark Holyoake broke the record for the Most Rotations on a Pommel Horse in 60 seconds with 65.

Education
Mark Holyoake obtained BSc Sport and Exercise Science degree from Auckland University.

See also
New Zealand at the 2010 Commonwealth Games
Les Mills International

References

External links

 Mark Holyoake athlete profile
 
 Mark Holyoake at 19th Commonwealth Games

1983 births 
Living people
Commonwealth Games competitors for New Zealand 
Gymnasts at the 2010 Commonwealth Games
Gymnasts at the 2006 Commonwealth Games
New Zealand male artistic gymnasts
University of Auckland alumni
Sportspeople from Wellington City
21st-century New Zealand people